Arundel Gardens is an unincorporated community in Anne Arundel County, Maryland, United States. Arundel Gardens is located along Maryland Route 2 north of Interstate 695, in the southern part of the Brooklyn Park census-designated place.

References

Unincorporated communities in Anne Arundel County, Maryland
Unincorporated communities in Maryland